The following are the winners of the 34th annual (2007) Origins Award, presented at the 2008 Origins Game Fair

References

External links
 2007 Origins Award Winners and Nominees

2007 awards
 
2007 awards in the United States